Iosif Varga may refer to:

 Iosif Varga (rower) (born 1934), Romanian rower
 Iosif Varga (footballer) (1941–1992), Romanian footballer